The term fibromatosis refers to a group of  soft tissue tumors which have certain characteristics in common, including absence of cytologic and clinical malignant features, a histology consistent with proliferation of well-differentiated fibroblasts, an infiltrative growth pattern, and aggressive clinical behavior with frequent local recurrence. It is classed by the World Health Organization as an intermediate soft tissue tumor related to the sarcoma family.

Diagnosis

Subtypes
Subtypes of fibromatosis include –
 Juvenile fibromatosis
 Fibromatosis colli: Benign sternocleidomastoid muscle tumor developing in infants within 8 weeks (average: 24 days) of delivery. It generally does not require resection and responds well to physiotherapy. 
 Infantile digital fibromatosis
 Infantile myofibromatosis: Solitary tumors commonly occurring in the head and neck regions; multiple tumors occurring in the skin, subcutaneous tissue, muscles, and/or less commonly bones; or, rarely, tumors occurring in an internal organ(s).
 Ipofibromatosis
 Fibromatosis hyalinica multiplex
 Penile fibromatosis (Peyronie's disease)
 Palmar fibromatosis (Dupuytren's contracture)
 Plantar fibromatosis (Ledderhose disease)

Treatment
Treatment is mainly surgical; radiotherapy or chemotherapy is usually an indication of relapse. Head and neck desmoid fibromatosis is a serious condition due to local aggression, specific anatomical patterns and the high rate of relapse. For children surgery is particularly difficult, given the potential for growth disorders.

Treatment includes prompt radical excision with a wide margin and/or radiation. Despite their local infiltrative and aggressive behavior, mortality is minimal to nonexistent for peripheral tumours. In intra-abdominal fibromatosis associated with Familial adenomatous polyposis (FAP), surgery is avoided if possible due to high rates of recurrence within the abdomen carrying significant morbidity and mortality. Conversely, for intra-abdominal fibromatosis without evidence of FAP extensive surgery may still be required for local symptoms, but the risk of recurrence is low.

Terminology
Other names include "musculoaponeurotic fibromatosis," referring to the tendency of these tumors to be adjacent to and infiltrating deep skeletal muscle, aggressive fibromatosis and "desmoid tumor." A clear difference should be made between intra-abdominal and extra-abdominal localizations. Fibromatosis is a different entity from neurofibromatosis.

References

External links 
 

Soft tissue disorders